Aigle is a municipality of the canton of Vaud, Switzerland.

Aigle is a French word which means eagle and may also refer to:

In geography:
 L'Aigle, a commune in the départment of Orne, France
 Aigle (district), a district of the canton of Vaud, Switzerland
 Aigle River (Doda Lake), Quebec, Canada
 Aigle River (Desert River tributary), Quebec, Canada

In engineering:
 Aigle (rocket), a French experimental rocket

In business:
 Aigle (company), a French clothing brand

Of people:
 Caroline Aigle, the first woman to become fighter pilot in the Armée de l'Air
 Aigle, a character in the video games Rumble Roses and Rumble Roses XX

Ships named Aigle:
 List of French ships named Aigle
 Aigle-class destroyer